Vernier is a municipality in the Canton of Geneva, Switzerland.  It is divided into different sections: Vernier Village, Le Lignon, Aïre, Les Avanchets, Cointrin and Châtelaine.

Geography

Of this area,  or 13.2% is used for agricultural purposes, while  or 9.6% is forested.

Of the built up area, industrial buildings made up 10.0% of the total area while housing and buildings made up 32.8% and transportation infrastructure made up 15.9%.  Power and water infrastructure as well as other special developed areas made up 7.6% of the area while parks, green belts and sports fields made up 6.3%.  Out of the forested land, 8.5% of the total land area is heavily forested and 1.2% is covered with orchards or small clusters of trees.  Of the agricultural land, 6.4% is used for growing crops and 5.9% is pastures.  All the water in the municipality is flowing water.

The municipality of Vernier consists of the sub-sections or villages of Champs-Prévost, Bel-Ebat, Etang-des-Tritons, Blandonnet, Les Avanchets, Balexert - centre, Vernier - Cointrin, Balexert - Crozet, Châtelaine - SIMONET, Châtelaine - village, Etang - Philibert-de-SAUVAGE.

Demographics

, 43.8% of the population are resident foreign nationals. Over the last 10 years (1999–2009 ) the population has changed at a rate of 13.2%. It has changed at a rate of 6.3% due to migration and at a rate of 7.1% due to births and deaths.

Most of the population speaks French (21,767 or 73.6%), with Portuguese being second most common (1,582 or 5.4%) and Italian being third (1,452 or 4.9%).  There are 908 people who speak German and 23 people who speak Romansh.

, the gender distribution of the population was 49.6% male and 50.4% female.  The population was made up of 8,712 Swiss men (26.0% of the population) and 7,916 (23.6%) non-Swiss men.  There were 9,741 Swiss women (29.1%) and 7,148 (21.3%) non-Swiss women. Of the population in the municipality 5,327 or about 18.0% were born in Vernier and lived there in 2000.  There were 5,528 or 18.7% who were born in the same canton, while 3,890 or 13.2% were born somewhere else in Switzerland, and 13,422 or 45.4% were born outside of Switzerland.

In  there were 184 live births to Swiss citizens and 164 births to non-Swiss citizens, and in same time span there were 111 deaths of Swiss citizens and 36 non-Swiss citizen deaths.  Ignoring immigration and emigration, the population of Swiss citizens increased by 73 while the foreign population increased by 128.  There were 74 Swiss men and 87 Swiss women who emigrated from Switzerland.  At the same time, there were 318 non-Swiss men and 333 non-Swiss women who immigrated from another country to Switzerland.  The total Swiss population change in 2008 (from all sources, including moves across municipal borders) was an increase of 205 and the non-Swiss population increased by 391 people.  This represents a population growth rate of 1.9%.

The age distribution of the population is children and teenagers (0–19 years old) make up 25.4% of the population, while adults (20–64 years old) make up 62.3% and seniors (over 64 years old) make up 12.3%.

, there were 12,250 people who were single and never married in the municipality.  There were 13,922 married individuals, 1,262 widows or widowers and 2,125 individuals who are divorced.

, there were 12,211 private households in the municipality, and an average of 2.3 persons per household. There were 4,296 households that consist of only one person and 793 households with five or more people.  Out of a total of 12,471 households that answered this question, 34.4% were households made up of just one person and there were 49 adults who lived with their parents.  Of the rest of the households, there are 2,754 married couples without children, 3,917 married couples with children There were 1,040 single parents with a child or children.  There were 155 households that were made up of unrelated people and 260 households that were made up of some sort of institution or another collective housing.

 there were 1,103 single family homes (or 56.2% of the total) out of a total of 1,964 inhabited buildings.  There were 578 multi-family buildings (29.4%), along with 203 multi-purpose buildings that were mostly used for housing (10.3%) and 80 other use buildings (commercial or industrial) that also had some housing (4.1%).  Of the single family homes 113 were built before 1919, while 172 were built between 1990 and 2000.  The greatest number of single family homes (228) were built between 1946 and 1960.  The most multi-family homes (165) were built between 1961 and 1970 and the next most (105) were built between 1946 and 1960.  There were 36 multi-family houses built between 1996 and 2000.

 there were 13,219 apartments in the municipality.  The most common apartment size was 3 rooms of which there were 4,381.  There were 1,284 single room apartments and 1,856 apartments with five or more rooms.  Of these apartments, a total of 11,873 apartments (89.8% of the total) were permanently occupied, while 1,018 apartments (7.7%) were seasonally occupied and 328 apartments (2.5%) were empty.  , the construction rate of new housing units was 2.2 new units per 1000 residents. The vacancy rate for the municipality, was 0.16%.

The historical population is given in the following chart:

Notable people 

 Émilie de Morsier (1843–1896) a Swiss feminist, pacifist and abolitionist.
 Nelly Buntschu (born 1947) is a Swiss politician, Mayor of Vernier for eight years, 1999-2007 
 Lionel Pizzinat (born 1977) a Swiss footballer, over 320 games, mainly for Servette FC .

Politics
In the 2007 federal election the most popular party was the SVP which received 26.04% of the vote.  The next three most popular parties were the SP (21.89%), the Green Party (14.91%) and the LPS Party (9.17%).  In the federal election, a total of 5,690 votes were cast, and the voter turnout was 41.4%.

In the 2009 Grand Conseil election, there were a total of 14,102 registered voters of which 5,009 (35.5%) voted.  The most popular party in the municipality for this election was the MCG with 25.6% of the ballots.  In the canton-wide election they received the third highest proportion of votes.  The second most popular party was the Les Socialistes (with 14.8%), they were fourth in the canton-wide election, while the third most popular party was the Les Verts (with 12.0%), they were second in the canton-wide election.

For the 2009 Conseil d'Etat election, there were a total of 14,120 registered voters of which 5,858 (41.5%) voted.

In 2011, all the municipalities held local elections, and in Vernier there were 37 spots open on the municipal council.  There were a total of 22,129 registered voters of which 7,271 (32.9%) voted.  Out of the 7,271 votes, there were 45 blank votes, 105 null or unreadable votes and 394 votes with a name that was not on the list.

Its current mayor is M. Thierry Apothéloz, but a mayor is elected every year on the first of June between the administrative council, composing of three members, currently M.Thierry Apothéloz, the mayor, M. Yvan Rochat, the vice president and M. Thierry Cerutti, another member.

Economy
, Vernier had an unemployment rate of 8.7%.  , there were 41 people employed in the primary economic sector and about 7 businesses involved in this sector.  5,192 people were employed in the secondary sector and there were 316 businesses in this sector.  8,295 people were employed in the tertiary sector, with 809 businesses in this sector. There were 13,822 residents of the municipality who were employed in some capacity, of which females made up 44.6% of the workforce.

 the total number of full-time equivalent jobs was 12,129.  The number of jobs in the primary sector was 35, all of which were in agriculture.  The number of jobs in the secondary sector was 5,011 of which 2,133 or (42.6%) were in manufacturing, 3 or (0.1%) were in mining and 1,310 (26.1%) were in construction.  The number of jobs in the tertiary sector was 7,083.  In the tertiary sector; 2,767 or 39.1% were in wholesale or retail sales or the repair of motor vehicles, 361 or 5.1% were in the movement and storage of goods, 405 or 5.7% were in a hotel or restaurant, 397 or 5.6% were in the information industry, 142 or 2.0% were the insurance or financial industry, 345 or 4.9% were technical professionals or scientists, 375 or 5.3% were in education and 556 or 7.8% were in health care.

, there were 10,414 workers who commuted into the municipality and 10,942 workers who commuted away.  The municipality is a net exporter of workers, with about 1.1 workers leaving the municipality for every one entering.  About 12.7% of the workforce coming into Vernier are coming from outside Switzerland, while 0.0% of the locals commute out of Switzerland for work. Of the working population, 34.5% used public transportation to get to work, and 48.5% used a private car.

Religion
Of the rest of the population, there were 408 members of an Orthodox church (or about 1.38% of the population), there were 46 individuals (or about 0.16% of the population) who belonged to the Christian Catholic Church, and there were 556 individuals (or about 1.88% of the population) who belonged to another Christian church. There were 64 individuals (or about 0.22% of the population) who were Jewish, and 2,362 (or about 7.99% of the population) who were Islamic. There were 120 individuals who were Buddhist, 89 individuals who were Hindu and 55 individuals who belonged to another church.  5,990 (or about 20.26% of the population) belonged to no church, are agnostic or atheist, and 3,278 individuals (or about 11.09% of the population) did not answer the question.

Education

In Vernier about 8,149 or (27.6%) of the population have completed non-mandatory upper secondary education, and 3,058 or (10.3%) have completed additional higher education (either university or a Fachhochschule).  Of the 3,058 who completed tertiary schooling, 38.3% were Swiss men, 28.2% were Swiss women, 20.4% were non-Swiss men and 13.2% were non-Swiss women.

During the 2009–2010 school year there were a total of 6,827 students in the Vernier school system.  The education system in the Canton of Geneva allows young children to attend two years of non-obligatory Kindergarten. During that school year, there were 413 children who were in a pre-kindergarten class.  The canton's school system provides two years of non-mandatory kindergarten and requires students to attend six years of primary school, with some of the children attending smaller, specialized classes.  In Vernier there were 1,181 students in kindergarten or primary school and 197 students were in the special, smaller classes.  The secondary school program consists of three lower, obligatory years of schooling, followed by three to five years of optional, advanced schools.  There were 1,181 lower secondary students who attended school in Vernier.  There were 1,724 upper secondary students from the municipality along with 277 students who were in a professional, non-university track program.  An additional 194 students attended a private school.

, there were 449 students in Vernier who came from another municipality, while 2,114 residents attended schools outside the municipality.

Primary and secondary schools
Public schools in Vernier include the following:
Moyenne:
École des Ranches II
Elémentaire:
École Bourquin (Châtelaine)
École de Poussy
École des Ranches I
École des Ranches I Village
Moyenne and Elémentaire:
École d'Aïre (Aïre)
École d'Avanchet-Jura (Les Avanchets)
École d'Avanchet-Salève (Les Avanchets)
École de Balexert (Châtelaine)
École de Châtelaine (Châtelaine)
École des Libellules (Aïre)
École du Lignon (Le Lignon)
École de Vernier-Place

The Deutsche Schule Genf (DSG), the Geneva area's German international school, is located in the municipality.

Public libraries
Vernier is home to the Bibliothèque Municipale de Vernier library.

Transportation
The municipality has a railway station, on the Lyon–Geneva line.

International relations 

Vernier is twinned with :
  Ardusat, Romania

References

External links 

 Official Website 
 

 
Cities in Switzerland
Municipalities of the canton of Geneva